Middle East Entrepreneurs of Tomorrow (MEET), formerly known as Middle East Education Through Technology, is a program bringing together Palestinian and Israeli young leaders through technology and entrepreneurship. Working in partnership with the Massachusetts Institute of Technology (MIT) since 2004, MEET's goal is to educate and empower the next generation of Israeli and Palestinian young leaders to take action towards creating positive social and political change in the Middle East.

As of 2022, there are over 500 alumni who have graduated the three-year program

Structure

MEET teaches computer science, entrepreneurship and leadership to excelling high school students (age 15-17) over three years. The program comprises 3 consecutive summers with volunteer instructors from MIT, and weekly program sessions in the two intervening years at the MEET hubs in Jerusalem and Nazareth, taught by MEET alumni. Run entirely in English, the program provides MEET's 200 high school students with the skills, values and network to become "agents of change" in the region. Graduates of the program stay connected through the Alumni Program and continue developing social and business projects at the MEET Venture Lab in Jerusalem, in partnership with Google.

The students: excelling youth from the West Bank, Jerusalem (East and West) and the Nazareth area. Students are evenly distributed across gender and nationality and gain a deeper understanding of each other and the conflict through working on pragmatic projects with real world impact.

The entire program is conducted in English.  Neither students nor instructors pay to participate.

History
MEET was founded in 2004 by a group of young Israeli and Palestinian students and professionals. At the start, it was three friends: Anat Binur, a graduate student in political science at MIT, her brother, Yaron Binur, and Assaf Harlap, who came up with the idea. Soon after, Palestinian friends Abeer Hazboun and Sandra Ashhab joined the team.

Purpose

The program is designed to empower Israeli and Palestinian youth through education, and technology. By connecting students through joint interests and to opportunities to learn about each other, the program tries to empower young people.

MEET is grounded on the vision of developing common ground between Israeli and Palestinian youth, providing a safe forum for them to meet and discover one another's cultures, and explore similarities and differences.

MEET is affiliated with MIT.

See also
 Middle East
 Projects working for peace among Arabs and Israelis
 Seeds of Peace
 Cross-cultural communication

References

External links
 

Non-profit organizations based in Israel